Endophilin-B2 is a protein that in humans is encoded by the SH3GLB2 gene.

Interactions 

SH3GLB2 has been shown to interact with SH3GLB1 and SH3KBP1.

References

Further reading